Aglaia forbesii is a species of plant in the family Meliaceae. It is found in Brunei, Indonesia, Malaysia, Myanmar, and Thailand.

References

forbesii
Near threatened plants
Taxonomy articles created by Polbot